The Davis Field House is the gymnasium of Bob Jones University, Greenville, South Carolina.  The field house is a  facility with a main court seating 3,000.  The gym is used for intramural athletic basketball and volleyball games as well as other activities.  The field house features a suspended running track circling the courts and includes a swimming pool and classrooms for the BJU Division of Physical Education and Exercise Science.

References

Sports venues in Greenville, South Carolina
Bob Jones University
Basketball venues in South Carolina
College volleyball venues in the United States